The men's decathlon at the 1946 European Athletics Championships was held in Oslo, Norway, at Bislett Stadion on 23 and 24 August 1946.

Medalists

Results

Final
23/24 August

Participation
According to an unofficial count, 16 athletes from 11 countries participated in the event.

 (1)
 (1)
 (1)
 (1)
 (1)
 (2)
 (2)
 (1)
 (2)
 (2)
 (2)

References

Decathlon
Combined events at the European Athletics Championships